Chumphon may refer to
the town Chumphon
Chumphon Province
Mueang Chumphon district
Monthon Chumphon, a former administrative entity
Chumphon subdistrict in Moei Wadi District, Roi Et
Chumphon subdistrict in Ongkharak District, Nakhon Nayok
Chumphon subdistrict in Phon Phisai District, Nong Khai
Chumphon subdistrict in Sathing Phra District, Songkhla
Chumphon subdistrict in Srinagarindra District, Phatthalung